The 132nd Infantry Regiment was an infantry regiment of the United States Army, part of the Illinois Army National Guard.

It served as an active-duty regiment with the United States Army in World War I and World War II. Due to actions conducted in the fall of 1918 during WWI fighting in France, five men from the regiment were awarded the Medal of Honor:  Johannes Anderson, Sydney Gumpertz, Berger Loman, George H. Mallon,  and Willie Sandlin. In 1954 it was consolidated with the 131st Infantry Regiment.

Civil War Service
The 132nd Illinois Infantry traces its lineage back to the 19th Illinois Volunteer Infantry Regiment of the American Civil War.

World War I and interwar years
The 132nd Infantry Regiment was organized from other Illinois militia units, namely the Illinois 2d Infantry Regiment, and activated on July 21, 1917. Assigned to the 33rd Infantry Division, it was redesignated on 12 October 1917 as the 132nd Infantry Regiment and trained at Camp Logan, TX. Sent overseas in May 1918, the 132nd participated in the Battle of Hamel, the Meuse-Argonne Offensive, and the 1918 Somme offensive. The 132nd returned to the United States and was demobilized on 31 May 1919 at Camp Grant, Illinois, and inactivated that same year.

The unit reorganized between 1920-1921 in the Illinois National Guard at Chicago as the 2nd Infantry Regiment, while its regimental headquarters was federally recognized on 7 July 1921 at Chicago. The 2nd Infantry Regiment was redesignated on 31 December 1921 at the 132nd Infantry and reassigned to the 33rd Division as a National Guard regiment.

Commanders
 Colonel Abel Davis

World War II
The 132nd Infantry Regiment was inducted into federal service on March 5, 1941, at Chicago, Illinois, as part of the 33rd Infantry Division, and participated in divisional maneuvers at Camp Forrest, Tennessee. It was relieved from the 33rd Division on January 14, 1942, and assigned to Task Force 6814, an assemblage of units gathered for immediate transfer to Australia to defend against threatened Japanese invasion. On the morning of January 17, 1942, the last train car pulled away from Camp Forrest carrying the 123 officers and 3,325 enlisted men.  "Being one of the first infantry regiments to be moved overseas, the trains were guarded by F.B.I. agents." On January 20, 1942, it sailed from New York and arrived in Australia on February 27. On March 6 it sailed again, arriving in New Caledonia, where it became an infantry component of the newly created Americal Division on May 24, 1942.

The 132nd Infantry arrived on Guadalcanal on December 8, 1942, where it engaged in combat in the Guadalcanal campaign, including fierce fighting to capture Japanese positions in the Battle of Mount Austen. The Regiment was relieved and sent to Fiji with the rest of the Americal Division to rest and refit.

The 132nd next fought in the Bougainville campaign. It arrived at Cape Torokina on January 9, 1944, and relieved the 3rd Marine Parachute Battalion, the 3rd Marine Raider Battalion, and units of the 145th Infantry, which then reverted to the 37th Division. The 132nd Infantry took over that portion of the perimeter paralleling the Torokina on the extreme right flank and engaged in patrolling and in strengthening defensive positions. On April 5, 1944, after establishing patrols along Empress Augusta Bay, the 132nd successfully launched an attack to capture Mavavia Village. Two days later, while continuing a sweep for enemy forces, the Regiment encountered prepared enemy defenses, where they destroyed some twenty Japanese pillboxes using pole charges and bazookas. Later, the 132nd secured the heights west of Saua River in fierce fighting that lasted until April 18, when the last of the Japanese defenders were killed or driven off.

In 1945, the 132nd participated in the retaking of the Philippine Islands. On March 26, 1945, preceded by a heavy naval and aerial bombardment, troops of the 3rd Battalion, 132nd Infantry waded ashore across heavily mined beaches during an amphibious invasion of Cebu Island, at a point just south of Cebu City. Elements of the 132nd later secured Mactan Island and Opon Airfield in Cebu province.  On November 26, 1945, the 132nd was inactivated at Fort Lewis, Washington.

The 132nd was relieved on July 5, 1946, from assignment to the Americal Division and reassigned to the 33rd Infantry Division. It was reorganized and federally recognized on February 11, 1947, at Chicago as a component of the Illinois Army National Guard. It consolidated on March 15, 1954, with the 131st Infantry and the consolidated unit was designated as the 131st Infantry, an element of the 33rd Infantry Division.

Distinctive unit insignia
 Description
A Gold color metal and enamel device  in height overall consisting of a shield blazoned: Argent, a pairle Azure between chief an oak tree Proper within a circle of five mullets Gules, a palm tree to dexter and a prickly pear cactus to sinister both of the third. Attached above the shield a wreath Or, upon a grassy field the blockhouse of old Fort Dearborn Proper. Attached below and to the sides of the shield a Gold scroll inscribed "SEMPER PARATUS" in Gold.
 Symbolism
The shield is white charged with the pairle which appears on the shield of the city of Chicago, shield and pairle are white and blue, the Infantry colors. The green oak tree is for the WWI Forges Wood battle and the stars represent the five major operations in which the Regiment took part in France:
 Amiens, 4 July - 5 August 1918
 Somme Offensive, 8–20 August 1918
 Verdun-Frommerville, 8–25 September 1918
 Meuse-Argonne, 26 September - 21 October 1918
 Troyon, 25 October 2011 - 11 November 1918
The palm tree recalls Cuban and the cactus the Mexican border service. The crest is that of the Illinois Army National Guard. The motto "Ever Ready" was later amended into Latin "Semper Paratus."
 Background
The distinctive unit insignia was approved on 13 March 1925. It was amended to change the motto to Latin on 16 October 1926. The insignia was rescinded/cancelled on 20 October 1961.

Coat of arms

Blazon
 Shield
Argent, a pairle Azure between chief an oak tree Proper within a circle of five mullets Gules, a palm tree to dexter and a prickly pear cactus to sinister both of the third.
 Crest
That for the regiments and separate battalions of the Illinois Army National Guard: From a wreath Argent and Azure, upon a grassy field the blockhouse of old Fort Dearborn Proper.
Motto SEMPER PARATUS (Ever Ready).
 Symbolism
 Shield
The shield is white charged with the pairle which appears on the shield of the city of Chicago, shield and pairle are white and blue, the Infantry colors. The green oak tree is for Forges Wood and the stars represent the five major operations in which the Regiment took part in France. The palm tree recalls Cuban and the cactus the Mexican border service.
 Crest
The crest is that of the Illinois Army National Guard.
 Background
The coat of arms was approved on 15 May 1924. It was amended to include the historical outline on 1 November 1926. The insignia was rescinded/cancelled on 20 October 1961.

See also
 List of Illinois Civil War Units
 Illinois in the American Civil War

Notes

Further reading
 Muehrcke, Robert C. Orchids in the Mud:  Personal Accounts by Veterans of the One Hundred Thirty-Second Infantry Regiment, 1985 
 Davis, Abel The story of the 132d Infantry, A.E.F., 1919

References
 
The Civil War Archive
132
132
1917 establishments in Illinois